"Everything" is the seventh single by Japanese singer Misia, released on October 25, 2000. It debuted atop the Oricon singles chart and held the position for four non-consecutive weeks, ultimately emerging as Misia's biggest hit and signature song. In the Japanese music industry, "Everything" is the best-selling single by a female artist released in the 21st century, as well as the third best-selling single overall for a female Japanese artist, behind Namie Amuro's "CAN YOU CELEBRATE?" and Hikaru Utada's "Automatic/time will tell".

The title song served as theme song for the drama "Yamato Nadeshiko", which starred Nanako Matsushima and Shinichi Tsutsumi.

"Everything" has been covered by various artists, including Erykah Badu featuring Common, Eric Martin, Boyz II Men and Charice Pempengco.

Track list

Charts

Oricon Sales Chart

Physical Sales Charts

Other charts

References

2000 singles
Misia songs
Japanese television drama theme songs
Songs written by Jun Sasaki
Songs written by Misia
2000 songs